Clupeosoma microthyrale is a moth in the family Crambidae. It was described by Eugene G. Munroe in 1977. It is found in Malaysia, where it has been recorded from Sabah.

References

Moths described in 1977
Odontiinae